KHKR (1210 AM) is an American radio station broadcasting a sports format. Licensed to Washington, Utah, United States, the station is owned by Townsquare Media.

KHKR has been granted an FCC construction permit to diplex at the KDXU site and decrease night power to 231 watts.

History
The station went on the air as KCLG on February 1, 1982. On May 5, 1987, the station changed its call sign to KONY. On September 9, 1999, the station became KUNF, and then KHKR on July 11, 2013.

References

External links

HKR
Radio stations established in 1982
1982 establishments in Utah
Townsquare Media radio stations